Clinical Laboratory Improvement Act of 1988 (CLIA 88) was passed in the USA subsequent to the publication of an article in November 1987 in The Wall Street Journal entitled "Lax Laboratories: The Pap Test Misses Much Cervical Cancer Through Labs Errors", which alerted the public to the fact that a pap smear may be falsely negative. The article implied that false negative tests resulted largely from the carelessness of doctors. Subsequent to this, claims involving pap smears showed an alarming growth. The Act aimed at a comprehensive regulation of gynecologic cytology laboratories.

References

1988 in law